The 2011–12 Serbian Hockey League season was the 21st season of the Serbian Hockey League, the top level of ice hockey in Serbia. HK Partizan  won the championship by defeating HK Vitez in the final.

Regular season

Both HK Vojvodina and Spartak Subotica were excluded from the championship, and HK Vitez advanced to play HK Partizan in a best-of-three league superfinal. Partizan had played the regular season in the multi-national Slohokej League.

Superfinal

External links
 2011-12 Season on hockeyarchives.info
 

Serbia